Vince Tunde Macaulay-Razaq (born 23 March 1961) is a basketball coach who is the head coach and general manager of the Manchester Giants of the British Basketball League.

A former player for Brixton TopCats, Tower Hamlets/London Towers and Hemel Royals, Macaulay acquired the Royals franchise (by then located in Watford) in 1998 for an upfront fee of £1,500 and relocated it to Milton Keynes.

Under his reign as owner, Macaulay has seen his team progress from whipping-boys to Play-off contenders. On 17 May 2007 he returned to coaching the franchise for a third spell, after the dismissal of Tom Hancock. Macaulay last coached the club when they were based in Hemel Hempstead and also stepped in as caretaker coach the last time Hancock was at the club in 1999. Following this period he was the Chairman of the BBL. He passed on the duty to Paul Blake, Managing Director of the Newcastle Eagles, in 2005. Macaulay also acts as a pundit for Sky Sports on NBA Sundays.

In 2011, Macaulay relocated the Lions franchise to London. In 2014, he became head coach of the club.

See also 
 British Basketball League
  London Lions(basketball)#Milton Keynes

References 

1961 births
Living people
London Lions (basketball)
London Lions coaches